Egernsund Bridge is a Danish bascule bridge that runs between cities Alnor and Egernsund.

Bridges in Denmark
Bascule bridges
Road bridges in Denmark
Bridges completed in 1968
1968 establishments in Denmark
Buildings and structures in Sønderborg Municipality